Rethink Afghanistan is a 2009 documentary by Robert Greenwald and Brave New Films, about the US military presence in Afghanistan following the terrorist attacks of September 11, 2001.

Produced and released eight years into the war, at a time when Congress was considering sending tens of thousands of new troops to Afghanistan, the film asks the American public to reconsider basic questions about the conflict, such as how much will it cost, in lives and money? How long will Americans troops be there? How do we know if we’ve won? What is our exit strategy?

The film was initially made available for free, online, in six consecutive chapters.  This staggered release allowed the filmmakers to stay atop an ever-changing news cycle. Greenwald characterized it as "the first real-time documentary."

Synopsis

Part 1: More Troops + Afghanistan = Catastrophe, questions the value of increasing the number of US troops in Afghanistan.

Part 2: The Most Dangerous Country in the World argues that the ongoing conflict may further destabilized Pakistan, an unpredictable and volatile nuclear power.

Part 3: The Cost of War explores the financial impact of the war, calculating that it could easily cost American taxpayers in excess of a trillion dollars.

Part 4: Civilian Casualties looks at the death and damage that children and other innocent non-combatants suffer as the war continues.

Part 5: Women of Afghanistan debunks the claim that American troops support a feminist revolution.  In this chapter, Afghan women report that they are suffering more than they did under the Taliban.

Part 6: Security features a variety of CIA and other experts predict that this military action will ultimately make the US less safe, increase anti-American sentiment abroad, and create more terrorists.

Objectives
The documentary campaign was designed to change the media narrative about the war, ultimately aimed at ending US involvement in Afghanistan. The key message, that military solutions won't change ingrained political, social and economic problems in Afghanistan, lead to the conclusion that US policy needed to be rethought to reflect that reality.  Greenwald stated that the film was intended as an organizing tool and  "our mission is to reach as many people as possible and motivate them to take action."

Production and distribution
At the time of production, Greenwald determined that the topic of the Afghanistan war was extremely time sensitive, as policy was being decided in Washington concurrently, including decisions regarding a 2009 troop "surge." This informed his decision to release the film in sequential segments, on a shoestring, fundraising as he went along.

Brave New Films released the short chapters on the internet, an innovative distribution method at the time.    As well as being streamed for free online, the completed film ran in a limited theatrical release, and was available on DVD.  Rethink Afghanistan was also shown at thousands of Brave New Films’ signature "house parties."

Impact
One of the first successes of the campaign occurred early in production. In July 2009, Greenwald and Brave New Films successfully helped retired Corporal Rick Reyes and other veterans testify before Sen. John Kerry and the Senate Committee on Foreign Relations.  Reyes, who served in both Iraq and Afghanistan, told the committee, "Sending more troops will not make the US safer; it will only build more opposition against us. I urge you on behalf of truth and patriotism to consider carefully and Rethink Afghanistan."

At the time, support for the war and for the "surge" of 33,000 troops was about 52%. As the Rethink Afghanistan campaign progressed, that support  dropped precipitously to 17%, lower than either Iraq or Vietnam.

By July 18, 2010, the Rethink Afghanistan campaign had become part of the major media narrative, to the point that Newsweek borrowed the title and idea for their cover story.  Capitol Hill got the message by June 2011, when President Obama announced an accelerated timetable for the withdrawal of American troops. As of February 2014, the US was on track for full troop withdrawal by the end of 2014.

Participants
 Anand Gopal - Afghanistan Correspondent, Christian Science Monitor
 Robert Pape - Professor, Political Science & Author, Dying to Win
 Andrew Bacevich - Professor, International Relations and History & Author, The Limits of Power
 Faiysal Alikhan - Founder FIDA (Foundation for Integrated Development Action) & Executive Director, The PESCO Group
 Stephen Kinzer - Foreign Correspondent & Author, Overthrow
 Ruslan Aushev - Lt. General, Russian Army (Ret.) & Chief, Committee of Russian Afghan Veterans
 Thomas J. Barfield - Professor, Anthropology & Pres., The American Institute of Afghanistan Studies
 Dr. Ramazan Bashardost - Member, Afghan Parliament & Presidential Candidate
 Shukria Barakzai - Member, Afghan Parliament & Founder/Editor-in-Chief, Aina-e-Zan (Women's Mirror)
 Mohammed Osman Tariq - Former Mujahid Commander, Soviet-Afghan War & Pres., The National Council for Peace and Democracy in Afghanistan
 Carl Conetta - Co-Director, The Project on Defense Alternatives
 Tariq Ali - Historian & Author, The Duel: Pakistan on the Flight Path of American Power
 Steve Coll - President/CEO, New America Foundation & Author, Ghost Wars
 Ahmed Rashid - Pakistani Journalist & Author, Descent into Chaos: The U.S. and the Failure of Nation Building in Pakistan, Afghanistan and Central Asia
 Rory Stewart - Director, The Carr Center for Human Rights Policy, Harvard University & Author, The Places in Between
 Catherine Collins - Co-Author, The Man from Pakistan
 Lawrence Korb - Senior Fellow, Center for American Progress & Senior Advisor, Center for Defense Information
 Linda Blimes - Co-Author, The Three Trillion Dollar War
 SSG. Christopher Bentley - United States Marine Corps
 Winslow Wheeler - Director, Straus Military Reform Project
 Jo Comerford - Executive Director, National Priorities Project
 Pratap Chatterjee - Managing Editor, Corpwatch
 Sonali Kolhatkar - Afghan Women's Mission
 Erica Gaston - CIVIC (Campaign for Innocent Victims in Conflict)
 Ann Jones - Author, Kabul in Winter
 Orzala Ashraf Nemet - Afghan Women's Network
 Kavita Ramdas - President/CEO, Global Fund for Women
 Sharmeen Obaid-Chinoy - Journalist & Filmmaker
 Fahima Vorgetts - Director, Afghan Women's Fund
 Fatana Gailani - Founder, Afghanistan Women's Council
 Robert Baer - Former CIA Field Operative, Middle East & Author, See No Evil
 Graham Fuller - Former CIA Station Chief, Kabul, Afghanistan & Former Vice-Chair, National Intelligence Council
 Tom Hayden - Author, The Long Sixties
 Robert Grenier- Former CIA Station Chief, Islamabad, Pakistan & Former Director, Counterterrorism Center
 Ursala Rahmani - Former Taliban Official
 Juan Cole - Author, Engaging the Muslim World

References

External links

 

2009 films
2009 documentary films
Documentary films about the War in Afghanistan (2001–2021)
American documentary films
Films directed by Robert Greenwald
2000s English-language films
2000s American films